Cody Shane Ware (born November 7, 1995) is an American professional auto racing driver. A third-generation driver with experience in stock car, sports car, and open-wheel racing, he is the son of NASCAR team owner Rick Ware. He competes full-time in the NASCAR Cup Series, driving the No. 51 Ford Mustang for family team Rick Ware Racing.

He won the Asian Le Mans Series championship in 2019–20 with Rick Ware Racing.

Racing career

Sports car racing
In 2014, Ware competed in the Lamborghini Super Trofeo North America series, winning Rookie of the Year honors.

In 2019, Rick Ware Racing formed an Asian Le Mans Series program with Ware and Mark Kvamme as drivers of the Ligier JS P2. In their first race at Shanghai International Circuit, despite missing qualifying and only having two laps of practice, Ware and Kvamme finished second in the LMPS Am class and 14th overall. On November 23, Ware announced he would compete in the 2020 24 Hours of Le Mans for EuroInternational. In January 2020's Asian Le Mans race at The Bend Motorsport Park, Ware and co-driver Gustas Grinbergas finished fifth overall and recorded the LMP2 Am Trophy class win.

In August 2020, Ware made his GT4 America Series SprintX debut at Sonoma Raceway, where he finished fifth overall and third in the Silver class for Dexter Racing.

When RWR partnered with Eurasia Motorsport to form RWR Eurasia for the 2021 24 Hours of Daytona, Ware was among the team's LMP2 drivers alongside Austin Dillon and Salih Yoluç.

NASCAR

Xfinity Series
In August 2014, he made his debut in the NASCAR Nationwide Series at the Mid-Ohio Sports Car Course, starting 26th and finishing 15th for RWR. Over the next five seasons, among the teams he raced for were MBM Motorsports, B. J. McLeod Motorsports, Team Kapusta Racing, and Mike Harmon Racing. During the 2019 race at the Charlotte Motor Speedway Roval, Ware was replaced by Stefan Parsons after feeling unwell due to a damaged coolbox in his car.

Ware returned to RWR's reformed Xfinity Series team in 2020 at the Charlotte Roval, where he recorded his first series top-ten finish in seventh.

Truck Series
In 2015, Ware joined MAKE Motorsports full-time for the 2015 NASCAR Camping World Truck Series season, competing for Rookie of the Year honors. However, on May 1, Ware announced that he would be leaving the team to attend college full-time, with aspirations for a pre-medical degree. Ware was replaced by Travis Kvapil in the No. 50.

Ware returned to the Truck Series in 2017, driving the No. 12 for RWR on a part-time basis. He attempted but failed to qualify for the 2018 season opener at Daytona with Mike Harmon Racing.

Cup Series

In June 2016, Ware attempted to make his Sprint Cup Series debut in the Toyota/Save Mart 350 at Sonoma Raceway, driving the No. 55 for Premium Motorsports, but he failed to qualify.

He joined RWR's Cup Series program, driving the No. 51 part-time in 2017. He made his Cup debut in the Folds of Honor QuikTrip 500 at Atlanta, driving the No. 51 with sponsorship from Spoonful of Music and Bubba Burger. Ware started and finished 39th, retiring from the race on lap 74 with steering problems. At Dover and Pocono, Ware's No. 51 acquired sponsorship from East Carolina University and Clemson University, respectively, with the latter also featuring logos celebrating the football team's 2017 College Football Playoff National Championship win earlier in the year. During the Dover race, Ware withdrew from the event after 283 of 406 laps after suffering from back pain. A week later at Pocono, he left the race after completing 35 laps, again for back problems. He was scheduled to drive at Michigan but Ware decided to stay out of the car for the race and the team did not find a replacement driver in time.

He returned to the No. 51 for Darlington's Bojangles' Southern 500, where he drove a car painted like Tom Cruise character Cole Trickle's Mello Yello vehicle of the same number in the film Days of Thunder; Ware's No. 51 featured logos saying "Pray for Texas", with RWR producing merchandise of the car and donating all proceeds to Hurricane Harvey relief efforts. On lap 157, Ware was involved in a wreck with Matt DiBenedetto and A. J. Allmendinger; after the race, Ware and DiBenedetto argued on Twitter over responsibility for the wreck. When DiBenedetto faulted Ware for the incident, the latter replied by falsely accusing him of infidelity, causing a firestorm that led to Ware deleting his social media for the rest of the season and up through 2018. A few months later, in February 2018, Ware restarted his Facebook profile and announced his Asperger's diagnosis in May. Ware later revealed in a January 2019 interview that the incident with DiBenedetto was one of his "biggest setbacks ever," but acknowledged "hitting rock bottom (after that) was the best thing that happened to me because that really gave me the wake-up call of 'hey, this is only going to get worse, and you're never going to come back from it unless you do something about it right now.'"

In 2018, Ware transitioned to motorcycle racing, but returned to the Cup Series for RWR at Dover. He also ran the Sonoma race, where he would DNF and place last.

Ware increased his Cup schedule in 2019 to 13 races, which also included the Daytona 500; in the race, he and RWR teammate B. J. McLeod crashed while several cars were entering pit road, causing him to finish 39th. At Sonoma, he was forced to exit the race on lap 64 when broken air conditioning caused him to suffer carbon monoxide poisoning. In September, he intended to race at the Charlotte Roval, but was replaced by J. J. Yeley as he continued to feel unwell from his damaged coolbox in the previous day's Xfinity race.

His lone 2020 Cup start was the YellaWood 500 at Talladega Superspeedway. Towards the end of the race, due to a lot of front runners being involved in crashes, Ware was racing in the top ten until he crashed on the backstretch on the final lap, but was able to finish 19th for his first Cup Series top 20.

On January 18, 2021, RWR announced Ware would run the full 2021 Cup season in the team's No. 51 car. During the April Martinsville race, Ware was involved in an incident with teammate James Davison: on lap 37, contact from Ware's right front fender into Davison's left rear quarter panel sent the latter spinning into the outside wall. The race was postponed to the next day after weather, and radio communications between Ware and his crew chief revealed displeasure towards Davison, with Ware threatening to turn him if he encountered him again. After the team threatened to park Ware, the two raced for the rest of the event. Ware missed the Richmond playoff race and was substituted by Garrett Smithley after he was sidelined with carbon monoxide poisoning following the 2021 Cook Out Southern 500 at Darlington. At Bristol Motor Speedway Ware got into Chase Elliott, the two would become heated after the race.

Ware returned to the No. 51 for the 2022 season, starting with a 17th place finish at the 2022 Daytona 500. At Sonoma, the No. 51 failed pre-race inspection four times and was hit with an L1 penalty, resulting in a start at the back of the field and a pass-through penalty on the first lap. In addition, the team was deducted 20 owner and driver points. On August 23, crew chief Billy Plourde was suspended for four races after the No. 51 lost a ballast during the Watkins Glen race. The following week at Daytona for the 2022 Coke Zero Sugar 400, Ware avoided a massive wreck with over 20 laps to go and was in P4 before the rain delay. After the delay, Ware ran with the leaders and finished a career best 6th place for his first career Cup Series Top 10 finish. At Texas, Ware was involved in a hard crash on lap 168 after hitting the turn 4 wall and hitting the pit wall afterwards, but was treated and released from the infield care center without serious injury. He sustained an impaction fracture on his ankle from the crash. Although Ware was cleared for (and competed in) the following Talladega race, Ware skipped the Charlotte Roval race due to his injury, with Yeley substituting him in the No. 51.

IndyCar Series
Entering the 2021 racing season, Ware expressed interest in running a part-time IndyCar Series schedule for Dale Coyne Racing with RWR, including the possibility of performing Double Duty of running the Indianapolis 500 and Coca-Cola 600 in the same day. In April, he participated in an IndyCar test for DCR at Texas Motor Speedway. He was entered for the 500 in the No. 52, and Garrett Smithley was placed in his No. 51 Cup car for that day's Coca-Cola 600; although Ware completed rookie orientation, a lack of sponsorship forced the entry to be withdrawn. Ware instead ran the 600 in the No. 53 that he took over from J. J. Yeley.

On June 15, it was announced that Ware would make his IndyCar Series debut at the REV Group Grand Prix at Road America, driving the No. 52 entry. He would go on to finish 19th and on the lead lap.

Personal life
In February 2018, Ware tweeted that he struggles with depression and anxiety. Three months later, he revealed on Facebook that he has Asperger syndrome.

In May 2021, Ware revealed that during his teenage years, a group of friends led him to the woods only to douse gasoline on him and set him on fire, resulting in severe burns on the back of his legs.

Ware's younger brother Carson races in the NASCAR Xfinity Series, NASCAR Truck Series, and ARCA Menards Series.

Motorsports career results

NASCAR
(key) (Bold – Pole position awarded by qualifying time. Italics – Pole position earned by points standings or practice time. * – Most laps led.)

Cup Series

Daytona 500

Xfinity Series

Camping World Truck Series

Whelen Southern Modified Tour

Toyota Series

 Season still in progress
 Ineligible for series points
 Ware began the 2018 season racing for Truck Series points but switched to Cup Series points before the race at Sonoma.
 Ware began the 2019 season racing for Cup Series points but switched to Xfinity Series points before the race at Talladega.
 Ware began the 2021 season racing for Cup Series points but switched to Xfinity Series points before the race at the Daytona road course.

Complete WeatherTech SportsCar Championship results 
(key) (Races in bold indicate pole position; races in italics indicate fastest lap)

24 Hours of Daytona results

Asian Le Mans Series results
(key) (Races in bold indicate pole position) (Races in italics indicate fastest lap)

American open-wheel racing results
(key)

IndyCar Series
(key)

* Season still in progress.

References

External links
 
 

Living people
1995 births
Sportspeople from Greensboro, North Carolina
Racing drivers from North Carolina
NASCAR drivers
People with Asperger syndrome
WeatherTech SportsCar Championship drivers
24 Hours of Daytona drivers
IndyCar Series drivers
Dale Coyne Racing drivers
Eurasia Motorsport drivers